The Rosebud County Deaconess Hospital, on N. 17th Ave in Forsyth, Montana, was built in 1920–21.  It was listed on the National Register of Historic Places in 1979.

The public hospital was built at cost of $90,000 during 1920–21.  It is a two-story building with a "daylight basement" which originally provided 21 beds of space and a surgery room.  A nursing home addition was completed in 1958.

It was deemed significant "for its historic associations with the settling of Rosebud County and Eastern Montana. Although the Architectural Design and the masonry construction were common for this time period in this sector of Montana, (viz. Georgian Revival), the structure's historical significance is stated in its function as one of the earliest medical facilities for the settlers of this rugged North West Country."

The hospital was operated by the Lutheran Hospital and Homes Society of Fargo, North Dakota up to 1959, when the Rosebud Treasure Hospital Association was incorporated to take over the hospital and provide a nursing home complex serving Rosebud County and neighboring Treasure County.

A new hospital building completed in 1973 replaced use of the historic building.  At the time of NRHP registration in 1978 the historic building was occupied by various county departments and there were plans for part of the building to be used as a health clinic.

References

Hospitals in Montana
Nursing homes in the United States
National Register of Historic Places in Rosebud County, Montana
Georgian Revival architecture in Montana
Hospital buildings completed in 1921
1921 establishments in Montana